Kyŏnggongopsong Sports Club (Kyŏnggong'ŏpsŏng, lit. Ministry of Light Industry Sports Club) is a North Korean football club affiliated with the North Korean , playing in the DPR Korea Premier Football League at the 10,000 capacity City Stadium in P'yŏngyang.

History 
Their best known finish in the National Championships thus far is 8th, in the 2006 season, however they have had other successes, including winning the Republican Championship in 2009, having defeated Amrokkang 1–0 in the final, and a second-place finish in the 2015 edition of the Osandŏk Prize.

Current squad

Notable former players
 Choe Myong-ho, wore number 8; former Visakha FC player in the Cambodian League.

Managers
 Kim Yong-chol

Achievements
 Republican Championship: 1
 2009

 Hwaebul Cup: 2
SF 2015, 2016

 Osandŏk Prize: 1
 2015

 Paektusan Prize: 1
 2007

 Poch'ŏnbo Torch Prize: 1
 2013

References

 
Football clubs in North Korea
Works association football clubs in North Korea